Brooks Sports, Inc., also known as Brooks Running, is an American sports equipment company that designs and markets high-performance men's and women's sneakers, clothing, and accessories. Headquartered in Seattle, Washington, Brooks products are available in 60 countries worldwide. It is a subsidiary of Berkshire Hathaway.

Brooks, founded in 1914, originally manufactured shoes for a broad range of sports. "White hot" in the mid-70s, the company faltered in the latter part of the decade, and filed for bankruptcy protection in 1981. In 2001, the product line was cut by more than 50% to focus the brand solely on running, and its concentration on performance technology was increased. Brooks Running became the top selling brand in the specialty running shoe market in 2011, and remained so through 2017 with a 25% market share.

Brooks shoes have been named "Best Women's Running Shoe" and "Best Winter Running Shoe" by publications including Runner's World and Sports Illustrated. The company has been recognized for environmental sustainability programs and technical innovation.

History

Early history: Founding, Bruxshu Gymnasium Shoes, Carmen Manufacturing

Brooks Sports, Inc. was founded in 1914 by John Brooks Goldenberg, following his purchase of the Quaker Shoe Company, a manufacturer of bathing shoes and ballet slippers. Based in Philadelphia, it operated as a partnership between John Goldenberg and his brothers, Michael and Frank. By 1920, Quaker Shoes had been renamed Brooks Shoe Manufacturing Co., Inc., and its shoes were sold under the brand name Bruxshu. In addition to bathing shoes and ballet slippers, it sold a gymnasium shoe, Ironclad Gyms. The company's innovations included the 1938 introduction of orthopedic shoes for children, Pedicraft, and rubber brakes for roller skates (then known as "quick stops"), patented in 1944.

In 1938, the Goldenbergs bought the Carmen Shoe Manufacturing Company in Hanover, Pennsylvania. Until 1957 a better grade leather was purchased, cut, stitched and fit in Philadelphia, while the same procedure in Hanover used lower grade materials. Both shoes were sold in Philadelphia under the Brooks name, and ranged from inexpensive to high-priced. 
 
In 1956, after a series of operational changes, John notified his brother that he would not renew their partnership agreement, and Michael discussed expanding Carmen with his nephew, Frank's son Barton. In 1957, following the dissolution of the partnership, the existence of Brooks Shoe Manufacturing Company was terminated, and Michael and Barton each acquired 50% of Carmen. In 1958, Michael purchased Barton's interest in the company, and as the sole owner, he renamed Carmen the Brooks Manufacturing Company.

1970s: Introduction of EVA, the Vantage, Runner's World #1 running shoe
In 1975, Brooks worked with elite runners, including Marty Liquori, a former Olympian, to design a running shoe. The collaboration produced the Villanova, Brooks's first high-performance running shoe. It was the first running shoe to use EVA, an air-infused foam that was quickly adopted by other athletic brands.  Brooks followed the Villanova with the Vantage, a running shoe constructed with a wedge to address overpronation. In 1977, based on newly developed measurements of cushioning, flexibility, and durability, the Vantage was ranked at #1 in the annual Runner's World running guide. Runners embraced Brooks' technology, and the demand "exploded". Towards the end of the decade Brooks was among the top three selling brands in the US. The Vanguard was another running shoe which appeared in this decade.

1980s: Bankruptcy, the Chariot, Brooks for Women
In 1980, as a result of production issues with Brooks's manufacturing facility in Puerto Rico, defective shoes began to arrive at sporting goods stores. Nearly 30 percent of the shoes were returned, and Brooks scrapped 50,000 pairs. The company filed for Chapter 11 bankruptcy, and was purchased at auction by footwear manufacturer Wolverine World Wide in 1981.

In 1982, stability became the top priority for runners, and Brooks introduced the Chariot, a medial post shoe that featured an angled wedge of harder-density foam in the midsole. Thicker on the inside of the shoe and tapered toward the outside, the Chariot represented a "sea change" in running-shoe design. In 1987, with Brooks for Women, it launched an anatomically adjusted line of shoes designed for women.

1990s: The Beast, Adrenaline, ownership changes, apparel, Run Happy

In 1992, Brooks launched the Beast, a motion control shoe that integrated diagonal rollbar technology. In 1994, the Adrenaline GTS—an abbreviation for go-to shoe—was released. With a firmer midsole density, the Adrenaline GTS was built on a semi-curve, an accommodation for runners with a high arch and wide forefoot. The Beast became a best seller, and the Adrenaline GTS went on to become one of the best-selling running shoes of all time.

Wolverine moved Brooks away from the niche running market to a generalist athletic brand. The "class to mass" strategy was unsuccessful, and Brooks was sold to Norwegian private equity company The Rokke Group for $21 million in 1993. Brooks moved to Rokke's Seattle location following its acquisition. In 1998, Rokke sold a majority interest in Brooks to J.H. Whitney & Co., a Connecticut private equity firm.

Brooks introduced a full-line of technical running and fitness apparel for women and men in the spring of 1997. It also expanded into the walking category with the introduction of performance walking shoes.

Brooks's Run Happy tag line first appeared in print advertising in 1999. Rather than depicting running as a grueling pursuit, as competitive brands did, Run Happy was based on the idea that runners love running, and suggested that Brooks products allowed "runners to have the running experience they were looking for".

2000s: Jim Weber, Berkshire Hathaway, BioMoGo
In 2001, Jim Weber, a former Brooks board member, was named president and CEO of the company.  At the time, the company's market share was low, and bankruptcy had again become a concern. Weber cut lower-priced footwear from the Brooks product line, added an on-site lab and staff engineers, and focused the company on technical-performance running shoes. As the brand was rebuilt, its annual revenue fell to $20 million. Three years later, it was $69 million.

Brooks was acquired by Russell Athletic in 2004. In 2006, Russell was purchased by Fruit of the Loom and Brooks became a subsidiary of Fruit of the Loom's parent company, Berkshire Hathaway. It became an independent subsidiary of Berkshire Hathaway in 2011.

In the mid-2000s, Brooks introduced High Performance Green Rubber, a material it developed for outsoles that used sand rather than petroleum. It subsequently developed BioMoGo, the first biodegradable mid-sole for running shoes. It used a non-toxic, natural additive that increased the rate of biodegradation by encouraging microbes in the soil to break the material down into nutrients that could be used by plants and animals, biodegrading approximately 20 times faster than traditional soles. By using BioMoGo, Brooks estimated that it would cut more than 30 million pounds of landfill waste over a 20-year period. The BioMoGo technology was open source.

2010s: DNA, $500 million milestone, Brooks Heritage, 2017 awards, FitStation 
Brooks DNA (and later Super DNA) was released in 2013. It provided customized cushioning, and adapted to the user's gender, weight and pace. Engineered from non-Newtonian liquid, it was another of Brooks's technological "firsts".

In 2011, Brooks became the leading running shoe in the specialty market. On its 100-year anniversary, with a 29% market share, Brooks revenue hit $500 million. Weber stated that based on the company's year-over-year growth, investments from Berkshire Hathaway and the support of its CEO, Warren Buffett, Brooks would become a billion dollar brand.

The Brooks Heritage Collection was launched in 2016, returning the Vanguard, the Chariot, and the Beast to the market. Only the technology was updated; the details of the original shoes, including the colorways, were replicated.

Brooks introduced the first customized performance running shoe based on personal biomechanics in the United States in December 2017. An in-store station that combines 3D foot scanning with gait analysis and pressure mapping, it was developed in partnership with HP and Superfeet.

In 2017, Brooks shoes were named Best Running Shoe (The Glycerine and the Launch, Sports Illustrated); Editor's Top Choice (The Adrenaline GTS 18, Runner's World); and Ten Best Running Shoes (The Levitate, Men's Fitness).

Shortly after, Brooks developed the DNA Flash—their first nitrogen-injected midsole technology—and applied it to silhouettes such as the Hyperion Tempo as well as a few easy everyday running shoes. The brand worked with nitrogen injection for about three and a half years before releasing its DNA Loft V3 nitrogen-injected foam, which was introduced in the Aurora BL sneaker.

Sustainability and social responsibility
Brooks Running has implemented environmentally conscious practices into their business and manufacturing practices. Several models of their shoes have High Performance Rubber Green (HPR Green) outsoles that are made with sand instead of petroleum. The company says that it uses recycled materials to make other parts of their shoes "whenever possible", including laces, fabrics, hangtags and packaging.

In 2014, the company partnered with Bluesign Technologies (stylized as bluesign technologies) to evaluate, manage, and eliminate priority chemicals used in the process of manufacturing apparel. Manufacturers that become Bluesign system partners are required to establish management systems for improving resource productivity, consumer safety, water emissions, air emissions, and occupational health and safety.

Brooks is also a member of the Sustainable Apparel Coalition, a global trade organization that works to reduce the environmental and social impact of apparel and footwear products. With the some collections, Brooks offers vegan products.

Built in 2014, the Brooks headquarters meet the environmental standards of Seattle's Deep Green Pilot Program. The building captures and reuses at least 50 percent of storm water on the site and uses 75 percent less energy than a typical commercial building in the city. As of 2016, it was "one of the greenest buildings in the world".

Brooks provides paid time annually to employees to volunteer for community organizations. Among other causes, Brooks employees have supported ConservationNEXT's Seattle Backyard Collective, Habitat for Humanity, Northwest Harvest, the Seattle Ronald McDonald House and the 2018 Special Olympic Games. "Run B'Cause" product donation grants are given annually to organizations who support a "healthier, Run Happier world".

It was announced in June 2017 that Brooks Running would partner with the 2018 Special Olympics USA Games to create limited-edition co-branded running shoes and apparel, with a portion of the proceeds benefiting the games, and provide free running shoes to athletes participating in the Special Olympics Healthy Athletes Fit Feet program, which offers athletes free podiatric screenings.

Sponsorship

Team sponsorships
 Hansons-Brooks
 Brooks Beasts Track Club
 Brooks Mavericks
 Brooks Run Happy Team

Sponsored athletes (partial list)

Notes

References

External links

 

Shoe companies of the United States
Clothing companies established in 1914
Athletic shoe brands
Sportswear brands
Manufacturing companies based in Seattle
1914 establishments in Pennsylvania
Wallingford, Seattle
Berkshire Hathaway